Jorel's Brother is a Brazilian  animated television series created by Juliano Enrico and produced by Copa Studio for Cartoon Network Brazil since 2012. The series debuted on September 22, 2014, and is notable for being the first animated production exclusively produced by Cartoon Network Latin America (although their first very original production was the short series Santo vs The Clones), in which was confirmed that the show premiere in the region on February 2, 2015.

On December 8, 2015, it was announced that Jorel's Brother had been renewed for a second season. On May 25, 2017, the series was renewed for a third season. On May 25, 2017, the series was renewed for a third season.

Series Overview 
{|class="wikitable plainrowheaders" style="text-align:center;"
!colspan="2" rowspan="2"|Season
!rowspan="2"|Episodes
!colspan="2"|Originally aired
|-
!First aired
!Last aired
|-
| scope="row" style=background:#66b3ff; color:white"|
| 1
| 26
| 
| 
|-
| scope="row" style=background:#fade04; color:white"|
| 2
| 26
| 
| 
|-
| scope="row" style=background:#fb5470; color:white"|
| 3
| 26
| 
| 
|-
| scope="row" style=background:#339b67; color:white"|
| 4
| 26
| 
| 
|}

Episodes

Season 1 (2014-15)

Season 2 (2016-17)

Shorts (2017)

References 

Lists of Brazilian television series episodes
Lists of animated television series episodes
Lists of children's television series episodes